Dollery is a surname. Notable people with the surname include:

 Colin Dollery (1931–2020), British clinical pharmacologist
 Keith Dollery (1924–2013), Australian cricketer
 Tom Dollery (1914–1987), English cricketer

See also
 Doller (surname)